This is a list of 177 species in Dorytomus, a genus of true weevils in the family Curculionidae.

Dorytomus species

 Dorytomus aericomus Broun, 1886 c
 Dorytomus affinis Billberg, 1820 c
 Dorytomus alaskanus Casey, 1892 c
 Dorytomus albisetosus Broun, 1914 c
 Dorytomus alternans Faust, 1882 c
 Dorytomus amplipennis Tournier, 1874 c
 Dorytomus amplus Casey, 1892 c
 Dorytomus annae Korotyaev, 1976 c
 Dorytomus arcuatus Dejean, 1821 c
 Dorytomus armatus Petri, 1902 c
 Dorytomus artjuchovi Korotyaev, 1976 c
 Dorytomus auripennis Desbrochers, 1872 c
 Dorytomus aurivillii Münster, 1928 c
 Dorytomus australis Broun, 1921 c
 Dorytomus bajulus Faust, 1890 c
 Dorytomus barbirostris Sturm, 1826 c
 Dorytomus basithorax Pic, 1901 c
 Dorytomus bicolor O'Brien, 1970 i c
 Dorytomus bituberculatus Redtenbacher, 1874 c
 Dorytomus brachialis Ziegler, c
 Dorytomus brevicollis LeConte, 1876 i c b
 Dorytomus brevisetosus Casey, 1892 i c
 Dorytomus budarini Korotyaev, 1977 c
 Dorytomus carpathicus Petryszak, 1984 c
 Dorytomus caspicus Zumpt, 1933 c
 Dorytomus castigatus Broun, 1909 c
 Dorytomus cephalotes Faust, 1894 c
 Dorytomus chinensis Faust, 1882 c
 Dorytomus ciliatus Iablokov-khnzorian, 1972 c
 Dorytomus cinereus Hochhuth, 1851 c
 Dorytomus columbianus Sleeper, 1955 c
 Dorytomus consonus Broun, 1913 c
 Dorytomus cuneatulus Casey, 1892 c
 Dorytomus decorus Klima, 1934 c
 Dorytomus dejeani Faust, 1882 c
 Dorytomus dentimanus Reitter, 1894 c
 Dorytomus dilaticollis Fairmaire, 1887 c
 Dorytomus dorsalis (Linnaeus, C., 1758) c g
 Dorytomus edoughensis Desbrochers, 1875 c
 Dorytomus egorovi Korotyaev, 1976 c
 Dorytomus elegans Sharp, 1883 c
 Dorytomus etorofuensis Kono, 1935 c
 Dorytomus fallax Faust, 1882 c
 Dorytomus fausti Zumpt, 1933 c
 Dorytomus filiolus Casey, 1892 c
 Dorytomus filirostris
 Dorytomus flavipes Dejean, 1821 c
 Dorytomus flavus Sturm, 1826 c
 Dorytomus floricola Broun, 1914 c
 Dorytomus friebi Zumpt, 1933 c
 Dorytomus frivaldszkyi Tournier, 1874 c
 Dorytomus frosti Blatchley & Leng, 1916 c
 Dorytomus frostii Blatchley, 1916 i c b
 Dorytomus fulvescens Broun, 1914 c
 Dorytomus fumosus Stephens, 1831 c
 Dorytomus fusciceps Casey, 1892 c
 Dorytomus galloisi Korotyaev in Ler (ed.), 1996 c
 Dorytomus globipennis Roubal, 1931 c
 Dorytomus grossus Broun, 1893 c
 Dorytomus gyllenhali Faust, 1882 c
 Dorytomus hirtipennis Bedel, 1884 c
 Dorytomus hirtus LeConte, 1876 i c
 Dorytomus hispidus Leconte, 1876 c
 Dorytomus howdeni O'Brien, 1970 i c
 Dorytomus hystricula Casey, 1892 i c b
 Dorytomus ictor (Herbst, J.F.W., 1795) c g
 Dorytomus imbecillus Faust, 1882 i c b
 Dorytomus immaculatus Faust, 1882 c
 Dorytomus inaequalis Casey, 1892 i c b
 Dorytomus incanus Mulsant & Rey, 1859 c
 Dorytomus indifferens Casey, 1892 c
 Dorytomus indigena Germar, 1817 c
 Dorytomus inexpectatus Korotyaev, 1976 c
 Dorytomus infirmus Desbr. d. Loges, 1907 c
 Dorytomus inquisitor Germar, 1817 c
 Dorytomus japonicus Zumpt, 1932 c
 Dorytomus kamtshaticus Korotyaev, 1976 c
 Dorytomus kerzhneri Egorov, 1974 c
 Dorytomus lapponicus Sahlberg, 1900 c
 Dorytomus lateralis Dejean, 1821 c
 Dorytomus laticollis LeConte, 1876 i c b
 Dorytomus lecontei O'Brien, 1970 i c b
 Dorytomus leucophyllus (Motschulsky, 1845) i g b
 Dorytomus linnaei Faust, 1882 c
 Dorytomus lonae Zumpt, 1933 c
 Dorytomus longimanus (Forster, J.R., 1771) c g
 Dorytomus longulus Faust, 1882 c
 Dorytomus luridus (Mannerheim, 1853) i c g b
 Dorytomus macropus Redtenbacher, 1858 c
 Dorytomus maculatus Stephens, 1829 c
 Dorytomus maculipennis Roelofs, 1874 c
 Dorytomus majalis Sturm, 1826 c
 Dorytomus malachovi Korotyaev, 1976 c
 Dorytomus mannerheimi (Gemminger, 1871) i c b
 Dorytomus maorinus Broun, 1913 c
 Dorytomus marginatus Casey, 1892 i c
 Dorytomus marmoreus Casey, 1892 i c
 Dorytomus melanophthalmus (Paykull, G. de, 1792) c g
 Dorytomus melastictus Broun, 1914 c
 Dorytomus meridionalis Desbrochers, 1870 c
 Dorytomus methvenensis Broun, 1914 c
 Dorytomus minutus Dejean, 1821 c
 Dorytomus mishka Korotyaev, 1976 c
 Dorytomus mongolicus Zumpt, 1932 c
 Dorytomus mucidus (Say, 1832) i c b
 Dorytomus nanus Dejean, 1821 c
 Dorytomus nebulosus
 Dorytomus necessarius Faust, 1882 c
 Dorytomus neglectus Korotyaev in Ler (ed.), 1996 c
 Dorytomus nigrifrons Dejean, 1821 c
 Dorytomus nordenskioldi Faust, 1882 c
 Dorytomus notaroides Kono, 1930 c
 Dorytomus nothus Rey, 1895 c
 Dorytomus nubeculinus Casey, 1892 c
 Dorytomus occalescens
 Dorytomus ochraceus Broun, 1881 c
 Dorytomus pallidesignatus Gyllenhal, L. in Schönherr, C.J., 1836 c
 Dorytomus parvicollis Casey, 1892 i c b
 Dorytomus paykulli Faust, 1882 c
 Dorytomus pectoralis Billberg, 1820 c
 Dorytomus peneckei Zumpt, 1933 c
 Dorytomus petax Sahlberg, 1823 c
 Dorytomus pilumnus Redtenbacher, 1858 c
 Dorytomus plagiatus Dahl, c
 Dorytomus planirostris Tournier, 1874 c
 Dorytomus pomorum Billberg, 1820 c
 Dorytomus puberulus
 Dorytomus pygmaeus Sturm, 1826 c
 Dorytomus rectirostris Faust, 1882 c
 Dorytomus repandus Dejean, 1821 c
 Dorytomus reussi Formánek, 1908 c
 Dorytomus roelofsi Faust, 1882 c
 Dorytomus ruber Faust, 1894 c
 Dorytomus rubidus Tanner, 1939 c
 Dorytomus rubrirostris (Gravenhorst) c g
 Dorytomus ruessi Formanek, 1908 g
 Dorytomus rufatus Zumpt, 1932 c g
 Dorytomus rufirostris Broun, 1880 c
 Dorytomus rufulus (Mannerheim, 1853) i c b
 Dorytomus rufus (Say, 1832)
 Dorytomus sahlbergi Faust, 1882 c
 Dorytomus salicinus
 Dorytomus salicis Walton, 1851 c
 Dorytomus sanguinolentus Bedel, 1884 c
 Dorytomus sanshiensis Kono & Morimoto, 1960 c
 Dorytomus schoenherri Faust, 1882 c
 Dorytomus septentrionalis Korotyaev, 1976 c
 Dorytomus setosus Zumpt, 1933 c
 Dorytomus shikotanus Kono, 1935 c
 Dorytomus silbermanni Wencker, 1886 c
 Dorytomus simplex Gozis, 1886 c
 Dorytomus stilla Sturm, 1826 c
 Dorytomus subcinctus Faust, 1882 c
 Dorytomus subdistans Voss, 1960 c
 Dorytomus subsignatus Leconte, 1876 c
 Dorytomus subsimilis Blatchley & Leng, 1916 c
 Dorytomus subsinuatus Blatchley & Leng, 1916 c
 Dorytomus sudus Broun, 1881 c
 Dorytomus suratus Seidlitz, 1875 c
 Dorytomus surutus Dejean, 1821 c
 Dorytomus suvorovi Reitter, 1911 c
 Dorytomus taeniatus (Fabricius, J.C., 1781) c
 Dorytomus terrestris Broun, 1914 c
 Dorytomus tortrix (Linnaeus, C., 1760) c g
 Dorytomus tremulae Dejean, 1821 c
 Dorytomus turkestanicus Formánek, 1912 c
 Dorytomus ussuricus Korotyaev in Ler (ed.), 1996 c
 Dorytomus vagenotatus Casey, 1892 i c b
 Dorytomus variegatus Dejean, 1821 c
 Dorytomus ventralis Dejean, 1821 c
 Dorytomus villosulus
 Dorytomus vittatus Broun, 1921 c
 Dorytomus vorax Germar, 1817 c
 Dorytomus williamsi Scudder, 1893 c
 Dorytomus winkleri Zumpt, 1933 c
 Dorytomus winteri Korotyaev, 1976 c
 Dorytomus zinovjevi Korotyaev, 1976 c

Data sources: i = ITIS, c = Catalogue of Life, g = GBIF, b = Bugguide.net

References

Dorytomus